Seattle Academy of Arts and Sciences (commonly referred to as Seattle Academy or SAAS) is a coed independent middle and high school located on Seattle, Washington's urban Capitol Hill. As of 2020, school review website Niche ranks Seattle Academy as the seventh best private high school, ninth best college prep private high school, and fifty-eighth most diverse private high school in Washington state.

History 
Seattle Academy was founded by Jean Orvis in 1983, who served as head of school until the 2008-2009 school year. From 2009 to June 2018 the head of school was Joe Puggelli, who previously had a long and varied career, including US Army service, publishing, education, and coaching. In July 2018 long-tenured faculty, staff, and coach Rob Phillips became Seattle Academy's  Head of School.

The school has a 21-member board, which consists of current parents, alumni parents and alumni of the school. The chair is David Sheppard.

The school has 1,069 students. Annual tuition is $39,750 during the 2021–2022 school year. The school consists of grades 6–12.

In 2017, the institution broke ground on a $48 million, five-story middle school building located at the intersection of 13th Avenue and Union Street.

SAAS consists of six main buildings: the Temple building (the school still shares the same building with the Temple De Hirsch-Sinai), which houses the Upper School Humanities Department; the Vanderbilt Building, the Arts Center, which houses math and art classes; the Gym, complete with a weight room, multiple exercise machines, and a basketball court (SAAS's gym is one of the largest school-owned gyms in the Seattle area); the STREAM Building, a Gold LEED certified facility dedicated to the Upper School Science curriculum; and the Middle School Building, a five-story middle school building which opened in Fall 2018, which is also LEED-certified and targeting LEED Gold.

Technology 
Seattle Academy has an extensive technology program, which includes full-time tech support staff, a fully wireless campus, and mandatory laptops provided for all Upper School students. The middle school has a full computer lab and a number of laptop banks.

The school has converted its former Moodle-based academic software to a customized, Schoology-based education software client.

Student life 

Seattle Academy has many student-run clubs and academic teams facilitated by faculty members. Notable teams include:
 Youth Legislature - multiple state officers elected
 Speech and Debate - Speech team is often State Champions; both compete at the national level
 Mock Trial - Outstanding Attorney and Witness awards won yearly
 Robotics - Won multiple awards at every level, including at the World Championships in 2017, 2018, and 2019.
 Athletics - SAAS Athletics have acquired many State and league championships over the years.
 Ethics Bowl -  1st Place in Washington State, twice

Facilities 
 Arts Center
The Arts Center, or AC, is one of the six main buildings currently used by Seattle Academy. The building was opened in 2001. The Arts Center holds the high school's arts programs, which include theater, dance, instrumental bands, vocal music, percussion, studio arts, and photography. It is a requirement for all students to take many arts courses at least once.

Art Center facilities include a darkroom, a video production studio, visual art studios, a metallurgy balcony, music classrooms, the 250-seat Orvis Theater, a smaller black box theater, dressing rooms, and a green room.
 Cardinal Union Building

The Cardinal Union Building is a five-story middle school building that opened at the start of the 2018-2019 school year. It added a second gym, rooftop playfield, lunchroom, and common spaces to the existing SAAS campus.

 Gym

The Gym was completed in 2003. This two-story building houses a dance studio, a weight-training room, and a regulation basketball and volleyball court with bleachers, among its other facilities.
 Temple
The Temple Building, which Seattle Academy shares with historical synagogue Temple De Hirsch Sinai, houses the Upper School Humanities Program. In addition, the school will often use the Temple's Sanctuary for all-school meetings.

Upper School students are accustomed to walking to the Temple Building for their Upper School Humanities classes.
 Theaters

The Orvis Theater (named for previous head of School Jean Orvis) is Seattle Academy's primary theater and is located in the Arts Center. The theater holds 250 seats and is equipped with advanced sound and lighting technologies. Each year, the Upper School holds three major high school productions: a comedy, a musical, and a drama.

An intimate black box theater is used to perform smaller shows, including Middle School productions.
 Vanderbilt
Acquired in 1998, the Vanderbilt is the second oldest of Seattle Academy's five buildings. The Vanderbilt Building houses Seattle Academy's English, History, and Science departments. The school's library and offices can be found on the second floor.
 STREAM Building

Completed in the summer of 2015, The SAAS STREAM Building is a facility dedicated to the Upper School Science curriculum and project-based integration of Science, Technology, Robotics, Engineering, Arts, and Mathematics.

The STREAM building includes 7 purpose-built science lab and studio spaces that have been designed to maximize both space and flexibility to meet current and future course needs. The building also features another important new space for SAAS - a Learning Commons. The Commons are dedicated to student collaboration, study, and research, as well as a place to spend free time and lunch.

 12th Avenue Conference Room
The 12th Avenue Conference Room is a small facility located between the Vanderbilt and Arts Center buildings. It is a multi-purpose space, commonly used for meetings and classes.

 Future

Seattle Academy of Arts & Sciences is planning to demolish some old industrial buildings, directly south of its existing Vanderbilt Building, for a new upper school building. LMN Architects is designing the five-story, 85,000-square-foot project at 1120 12th Ave., which will complete the school's Capitol Hill campus.

Link To New Building (Credit: Brian Miller)

References

External links

Seattle Academy of Arts and Sciences website

Schools in Seattle
High schools in King County, Washington
Private high schools in Washington (state)
Private middle schools in Washington (state)
Capitol Hill, Seattle